The Leader of the House, also known as the Manager of Government Business is responsible for managing and scheduling Government business in the Legislative Assembly of Queensland. The office is held by a member of the Ministry; until 2009, the office was always held by a Cabinet minister, but Judy Spence held the office as parliamentary secretary. Under changes made in October 2011, the office was given a salary greater than its holder would otherwise earn by virtue of his or her other ministerial office. The Leader of the House is the Chair of the Committee of the Legislative Assembly, which has responsibility for the way the body is run.

List of Leaders

Notes

See also
 Leader of the House (Australia)
 Premier of Queensland
 Speaker of the Legislative Assembly of Queensland
 Manager of Opposition Business in the House (Queensland)
 Government of Queensland

References

Parliament of Queensland
Queensland-related lists
Lists of political office-holders in Australia